Walter Fifita (born 6 June 1997) is a Tonga international rugby union player. He plays for Glasgow Warriors in the United Rugby Championship. He plays on the wing.

Rugby Union career

Professional career

He played for El Salvador in Spain for the 2018-19 season.

From 2019 to 2021 he then played for North Harbour in the National Provincial Championship in New Zealand.

On 12 October 2021 Fifita signed for Glasgow Warriors. He stated:
I’m pretty stoked to be signed for Glasgow and start this new chapter in my career. I can’t wait to step out onto the field with these guys and I’m really happy. I’m really grateful for the opportunity and I want to thank both my agent and Glasgow for presenting me with it. Coming overseas was a big chance for me – I enjoyed my experience of it in the past when I was in Spain, and I’m looking forward to making more memories. I love to carry the ball and hopefully I can show the fans what I can do on the field.

He made his competitive debut for the Warriors on 8 January 2022, as a substitute in the match against the Ospreys in the United Rugby Championship. Fifita earned the Glasgow Warrior No. 340.

International career

He made his debut for Tonga in 2021 against the All Blacks.

References

External links
itsrugby.co.uk profile

1997 births
Tongan rugby union players
Living people
Rugby union wings
Glasgow Warriors players
Tonga international rugby union players
North Harbour rugby union players
Rugby sevens players at the 2022 Commonwealth Games